The Hilton Head Island–Bluffton metropolitan area, officially the Hilton Head Island–Bluffton, SC Metropolitan Statistical Area as defined by the United States Census Bureau, is a metropolitan statistical area consisting of the two southernmost counties in the Lowcountry region of South Carolina, centered on the resort town of Hilton Head Island. As of the 2020 census, the MSA had a population of 215,908. Prior to March 2013, the region was considered a micropolitan statistical area.

Counties
Beaufort
Jasper

Communities
Places with more than 30,000 inhabitants
Hilton Head Island (Principal city)
Places with 20,000 to 30,000 inhabitants
Bluffton (Principal city)
Places with 10,000 to 20,000 inhabitants
Beaufort (Beaufort County, seat)
Port Royal
Places with 5,000 to 10,000 inhabitants
Burton
Hardeeville
Laurel Bay
Places with fewer than 5,000 inhabitants
Ridgeland (Jasper County, seat)
Shell Point (census-designated place)
Yemassee (partial)
Unincorporated places
Beaufort County
Dale
Fripp Island
Harbor Island
Lady's Island
Lobeco
Okatie
Pritchardville
St. Helena Island, including Frogmore and Lands End
Sheldon
Sun City
Jasper County
Coosawhatchie
Grahamville
Levy
Limehouse
Old House
Robertville
Switzerland
Tillman

Demographics
The population was 187,010 at the 2010 census.

As of the census of 2000, there were 141,615 people, 52,574 households, and 38,147 families residing within the MSA. The racial makeup of the MSA was 66.53% White, 28.17% African American, 0.28% Native American, 0.74% Asian, 0.05% Pacific Islander, 2.92% from other races, and 1.30% from two or more races. Hispanic or Latino of any race were 6.64% of the population.

The median income for a household in the MSA was $38,860, and the median income for a family was $44,749. Males had a median income of $29,974 versus $23,170 for females. The per capita income for the MSA was $19,769.

See also
South Carolina statistical areas
South Carolina Lowcountry

References

Geography of Beaufort County, South Carolina
Geography of Jasper County, South Carolina